is a public library in Hakodate, Hokkaidō, Japan. The library is known in particular for its important collection of northern materials and for its .

History
In the first year of the Shōwa era (1926), city councillors approved the design of a new municipal library, three storey, again in reinforced concrete. With the approval of the private Hakodate Library's director , its entire collection was donated and transferred, and in 1928 the new  opened to the public. Duty to the city's growth, a number of local libraries were opened in the following decades. In 2005 the new Hakodate City Central Library opened across the road from Goryōkaku.

Gallery

See also
 List of libraries in Japan
 Hakodate City Museum
 Hakodate City Museum of Northern Peoples
 Hakodate City Museum of Literature
 Ishikawa Takuboku

References

External links
  Hakodate City Central Library
  Hakodate City Central Library Digital Archives

Buildings and structures in Hakodate
Education in Hakodate
Libraries in Japan
Libraries established in 1928
1928 establishments in Japan